Rue de Belleville is a street in the 19th and 20th arrondissement of Paris.

References

Belleville, Paris
Belleville
Belleville